Halle-Trotha station is a railway station in the municipality of Halle (Saale), located in Saxony-Anhalt, Germany.

References

Railway stations in Halle (Saale)
Railway stations in Germany opened in 1872